The Bolivian National Congress 1966–1969 was elected on 3 July 1966.

Chamber of Deputies 

Source:

Chamber of Senators 

Source:

Presidents of the National Congress 

Source:

Presidents of the Chamber of Senators

Presidents of the Chamber of Deputies 

FRB – Front of the Bolivian Revolution (Frente de la Revolución Boliviana). Electoral alliance formed by
Popular Christian Movement, MPC;
Social Democratic Party, PSD;
Revolutionary Left Party, PIR;
Authentic Revolutionary Party, PRA.

CDC – Christian Democratic Community (Comunidad Democratica Cristiana). Electoral alliance formed by
Bolivian Socialist Falange, FSB;
National Association of Democratic Professions, ANPD;
Democratic Revolutionary Alliance, ADR.

MNR-Paz – Revolutionary Nationalist Movement-Víctor Paz Estenssoro.

Notes

Political history of Bolivia